WDOR (AM) (910 AM) is a radio station licensed to Sturgeon Bay, Wisconsin, United States and serving the Sturgeon Bay, Wisconsin area, as well as the Door and Kewaunee Counties along with Green Bay to the South.

WDOR AM/FM both broadcast a Full Service/Adult Contemporary format.

Programming
Programming includes local talk shows, local news, ABC News Radio, and a music mix of Oldies, 1980s, 1990s & today's adult contemporary. Sports programming includes local high school sports, Door County League Baseball, Wisconsin Badgers Football and Basketball, and the Milwaukee Brewers.

History

Broadcasting first in 1951 at 910 AM and later adding 93.9 FM in 1966, WDOR has been the "Heart of the Door Peninsula" for over 50 years.  Door County Broadcasting Co. Inc. and the Allen family and a few minority stockholders have owned WDOR for over half a century.  WDOR operates on 910 kHz and some AM receivers generate a whistle on that frequency, as it is twice the frequency of the IF stages in AM receivers (455 kHz).  WDOR operates daytime only.

External links
 WDOR official website
 
 
 

DOR
News and talk radio stations in the United States
Mainstream adult contemporary radio stations in the United States
Oldies radio stations in the United States
Sports radio stations in the United States